Ed Risling is an American curler.

Teams

Personal life
His son Dale Risling is a curler too, he is a two-time United States junior champion (1981, 1982).

References

External links
 

Living people
American male curlers
American curling champions
Year of birth missing (living people)